The Nueva Ecija Solar Farm is a 500 MW solar power plant currently under construction in Peñaranda, Nueva Ecija to be developed by Solar Philippines. When completed it will be the largest solar power facility in the Philippines by capacity.

The project for the Nueva Ecija solar farm was first conceptualized in 2016. It would be built in phases with the first phase to produce 225 MW. Construction is planned for late-2021.

The facility will be operated under Solar Philippines' subsidiary SP New Energy Corporation (SPNEC).

References

Photovoltaic power stations in the Philippines
Buildings and structures in Nueva Ecija
Proposed solar power stations